The Asia-Europe Museum Network (ASEMUS) is an international cross-cultural network of museums. The museums in the ASEMUS network are located in Europe and Asia in those countries belonging to ASEM, a forum for dialogue between Europe and Asia sponsored by the European Commission. ASEMUS has two key aims: (a) to promote wider mutual understanding between the peoples of Asia and Europe by means of collaborative programmes of museum-based cultural activity and (b) to stimulate and facilitate the sharing, use and knowledge of museum collections of mutual interest.

Structure
ASEMUS membership is by invitation and open to: (a) all relevant museums of the ASEM countries which meet the ICOM definition of a museum (b) other institutions which are registered or registrable as museums within the ICOM definition by the appropriate national authority, and (c) academic departments in third level educational institutions throughout the ASEM countries which teach museum and heritage studies.

Funding
ASEMUS is the offspring of the ASEF structure and because its funding depends on ASEF, its remit is therefore confined to ASEM countries. ASEF is funded by voluntary contributions from its partner governments and shares the financing of its projects with its civil society partners across Asia and Europe.

Executive committee
Corazon Alvina, Director of the National Museum of the Philippines, Manila, The Philippines
Stéphane Martin, Director of Musée du Quai Branly, Paris, France (Chair)
Michael D. Willis, Curator, Department of Asia, British Museum, London (Deputy Chair)
Ms. Sabina Santaroasa, Director, Cultural Exchange, Asia-Europe Foundation (ASEF) Singapore
Chong Phil Choe, Director of the University Museum, Sejong University, Seoul, Korea (Vice-Chair)
Chen Xiejun, Director, Shanghai Museum, Shanghai, China
Claudius Müller, Director, Museum Five Continents, Munich, Germany
Sanne Houby-Nielsen, Director General, Museum of World Culture, Göteborg, Sweden
Alan Chong, Asian Civilizations Museum, Singapore
Jonathan King, Keeper of Anthropology, The British Museum, London, United Kingdom
Steven Engelsman, Director of the National Museum of Ethnology, Leiden, The Netherlands
Michael Ryan, Director, Chester Beatty Library, Dublin, Ireland
Karl Magnusson, International Cooperation Manager, Museum of World Culture, Sweden (Secretary)

Member institutions 
 Asian Civilisations Museum
 British Museum
 Chester Beatty Library
 Museum der Völker
 Museum Five Continents
 Museum of Asian Art of Corfu
 Museum of World Culture
 National Museum of Ethnology (Netherlands)
 National Museum of Fine Arts (Manila)
 Musée du quai Branly – Jacques Chirac
 Shanghai Museum

External links
 Asia-Europe Museum Network (ASEMUS) homepage 
 Facebook Asia-Europe Museum Network
 Asia-Europe Foundation (ASEF)
 Asia-Europe Meeting (ASEM)

International cultural organizations